Charles Hasse (1904–2002) was a British film editor.

Selected filmography
 The Girl Who Forgot (1940)
 My Learned Friend (1943)
 The Halfway House (1944)
 Champagne Charlie (1944)
 Dead of Night (1945)
 The Captive Heart (1946)
 Hue and Cry (1947)
 Mrs. Fitzherbert (1947)
 Private Angelo (1949)
 Something in the City (1950)
 There Is Another Sun (1951)
 Night Was Our Friend (1951)
 Emergency Call (1952)
 The Fake (1953)
 Albert R.N. (1953)
 It's Never Too Late (1956)
 A Touch of the Sun (1956)
 She Didn't Say No! (1958)

References

External links
 

1904 births
2002 deaths
British film editors